Paifang Hui and Manchu Ethnic Township is an ethnic township in Feidong County, Hefei, Anhui, China. Paifang was established in 1994, and is the only ethnic township in Hefei and the only multi-ethnic township in Anhui.

Paifang Hui and Manchu Ethnic Township is divided into:

 Paifang Ethnic Community
 Gaotang Community
 Caomiao Community
 Xinfeng Community
 Zhaofang Community
 Xujing Community
 Zhanggang Village
 Jianmiao Village
 Xingmiao Village
 Sanwang Village
 Xingyi Village
 Minxin Village
 Shuguang Village
Paifang is adjacent to Lukou Township to the east and Dianbu Township, the county seat to the south. It is connected to Zhongxing Township and borders Caomiao Township and Liangyuan Township in the north.

References 

Feidong County
Township-level divisions of Anhui
Ethnic townships of the People's Republic of China